John Beveridge (19362016), was a male rower who competed for England.

Rowing career
He represented England and won a gold medal in the coxless four and a bronze medal in the eights at the 1962 British Empire and Commonwealth Games in Perth, Western Australia.

He rowed for the Molesey Boat Club.

References

1936 births
2016 deaths
English male rowers
Commonwealth Games medallists in rowing
Commonwealth Games gold medallists for England
Commonwealth Games bronze medallists for England
Rowers at the 1962 British Empire and Commonwealth Games
Medallists at the 1962 British Empire and Commonwealth Games